Henry Simpson (1864–1926) was an architect active in Toronto, Ontario, Canada, around the turn of the 20th century. Simpson trained under prominent architect E.J. Lennox, and the buildings he designed were in the Richardsonian Romanesque style Lennox had helped popularize. He was one of the architects employed by the prominent Massey family, well-known philanthropists. Simpson worked with Charles J. Gibson from 1888 to 1890.

Over a dozen buildings he designed have survived to the present day. According to the Biographical Dictionary of Architects in Canada Simpson played a role in the design of 126 buildings from 1891 to 1916.

Simpson's buildings that have survived to the 21st Century

References

1864 births
1926 deaths
People from Old Toronto
20th-century Canadian architects
19th-century Canadian architects